In mathematics, Littlewood's Tauberian theorem is a strengthening of Tauber's theorem introduced by .

Statement

Littlewood showed the following: If an = O(1/n ), and as x ↑ 1 we have 

then

Hardy and Littlewood later showed that the hypothesis on an could be weakened to the "one-sided" condition an ≥ –C/n for some constant C. However in some sense the condition is optimal: Littlewood showed that if cn is any unbounded sequence then there is a series with |an| ≤ |cn|/n which is divergent but Abel summable.

History

 described his discovery of the proof of his Tauberian theorem. Alfred Tauber's original theorem was similar to Littlewood's, but with the stronger hypothesis that an=o(1/n).  Hardy had proved a similar theorem for Cesàro summation with the weaker hypothesis an=O(1/n), and suggested to Littlewood that the same weaker hypothesis might also be enough for Tauber's theorem. In spite of the fact that the hypothesis in Littlewood's theorem seems only slightly weaker than the hypothesis in Tauber's theorem, Littlewood's proof was far harder than Tauber's, though Jovan Karamata later found an easier proof.

Littlewood's theorem follows from the later Hardy–Littlewood Tauberian theorem, which is in turn a special case of Wiener's Tauberian theorem, which itself is a special case of various abstract Tauberian theorems about Banach algebras.

Examples

References
 

Tauberian theorems